Battle of the Riachuelo – 11 June 1865
Battle of Paso de Mercedes - 11 August 1865
Battle of Paso de Cuevas - 12 August 1865  
Battle of Yatay – 17 August 1865
Battle of Pehuajó or Corrales or Itati - 31 January 1866 
Battle of Estero Bellaco – 2 May 1866  
Battle of Tuyutí or Tuiutí – 24 May 1866
Siege of Uruguaiana or Uruguayana – August/September 1865.
Battle of Boquerón - 16 July 1866
Battle of Curuzú - 1–3 September 1866 
Battle of Curupayty or Curupaiti – 22 September 1866
Battle of Arroyo Hondo - 3 August 1867
Passage of Curupayty – 15 August 1867
Battle of Tatayibá - 21 October 1867
Battle of Potrero Obella - 28 October 1867
Battle of Tuyutí (second) - 3 November 1867
Siege of Humaitá – November, 1866 until August 1868 
Passage of Humaitá – 19 February 1868.
Battle of Ytororó or Itororó – 6 December 1868
Battle of Avay or Avahy – 11 December 1868
Pikysyry maneuver - 21 December 1868 
Battle of Lomas Valentinas or Ita Ybate – 21–27 December 1868, fought in two days.
Battle of Piribebuy or Peribebuí – 12 August 1869  
Battle of Acosta Ñu or Campo Grande – 16 August 1869
Battle of Cerro Corá – 1 March 1870

Paraguayan War
 
Paraguayan
Battles
Paraguayan War
Battles
Battles
Battles